The 2014 Tour de France was the 101st edition of the race, one of cycling's Grand Tours. It featured 22 cycling teams. The Tour started in Yorkshire, England on 5 July and finished on the Champs-Élysées in Paris on 27 July. The first two stages, in Yorkshire, were informally nicknamed Le Tour de Yorkshire; its success led to the formation of the Tour de Yorkshire stage race the following May.

Classification standings

Stage 1 
5 July 2014 — Leeds to Harrogate, 

The first stage began on The Headrow, outside the Victorian Town Hall in Leeds. The tour headed eastwards through the city centre towards Quarry Hill, navigating the Sheepscar Interchange onto the A61 and heading northwards through the city districts of Scott Hall, Moortown and Alwoodley towards Harewood House where a ceremonial start took place. Following the departure from Harewood, the tour went along the Wharfe Valley passing through Otley, Burley in Wharfedale and the home of the Cow and Calf Rocks, Ilkley Moor. The race then headed north via the A65 to the market town of Skipton, before passing into the Yorkshire Dales National Park. After passing northwards through part of Wharfedale, into Wensleydale and through Hawes, the route continued over the Buttertubs Pass and down through Swaledale to Reeth. The race then headed south-east to cross the last categorised climb of the day at Grinton Moor before passing through Leyburn, the brewery town of Masham and the cathedral city of Ripon. Finally, travelling southwards, on the A61, through Killinghall and finishing at West Park in Harrogate.

A  break saw Jens Voigt secure the King of the Mountains jersey for the day, before returning to the peloton. The finale of the stage saw Mark Cavendish crash during the sprint, following a collision with Simon Gerrans. Cavendish suffered a separated right shoulder injury. The sprint was won by Marcel Kittel, thus repeating his opening stage victory from the previous year.

{|
|-
|'Stage 1 result & General classification after Stage 1

|}

 Stage 2 
6 July 2014 — York to Sheffield, 

The second stage of the tour started at the racecourse in York heading to the city centre where it then travelled into West Yorkshire through the towns of Knaresborough, Harrogate, Silsden, Addingham, Keighley, Haworth, Hebden Bridge, Mytholmroyd, Elland, Huddersfield, Honley and Holmfirth. Passing into Derbyshire on the northern tip of the Peak District under the shadow of the Bleaklow plateau it then climbed over the Langsett Moors. Traversing across the moor the route crossed the Ewden valley and headed towards the village of Bradfield. From here the route descended towards the city of Sheffield where stage two finished.

During the stage, Sacha Modolo withdrew from the tour due to illness. Cyril Lemoine took the lead for the King of the Mountains jersey, from Jens Voigt, having scored the most points during the day. Blel Kadri and Thomas Voeckler were the first two riders over the Category 2 climb of Holme Moss, both riders later returning to the peloton. Towards the finish, Alberto Contador and Chris Froome each took the opportunity to test the opposition, reducing the peloton to a leading group of 21 riders up the short, but steep, Category 4 climb of Jenkin Road Hill. Vincenzo Nibali took the lead with  remaining, and held this short lead to the finish line.

 Stage 3 
7 July 2014 — Cambridge to London, 

This short 155 km stage began at Parker's Piece in the university city of Cambridge and started by heading in a generally southern direction towards Saffron Walden. From Saffron Walden the route travelled east, and then south, to the western outskirts of Braintree, Essex, before following the road west to Felsted. The route turned south to Chelmsford, and then west to an intermediate sprint at Epping Forest. From here, the race continued south into the British capital, which hosted the Grand Départ during the 2007 Tour de France. This was a prestigious stage which took the peloton through the Queen Elizabeth Olympic Park, and travelled past some of London's most famous landmarks, before finishing near to Buckingham Palace, with the finish line on The Mall.

Jean-Marc Bideau and Jan Bárta spent  out in front of the peloton, which was the greater part of the stage. Both riders each taking part in their first Tour de France, Bideau was the first to succumb to the gradual acceleration of the peloton, with  remaining, on the outskirts of central London. Meanwhile, Bárta managed to stay in front for a further . The peloton was then together for a bunch sprint on The Mall. Marcel Kittel succeeded in securing his sixth stage win at the Tour de France, and his second stage win of the 2014 Tour.

 Stage 4 
8 July 2014 — Le Touquet-Paris-Plage to Lille Métropole, 

The first stage in France departed from the seaside resort of Le Touquet, with racing officially starting just east of Cucq. The first climb of the day was the Category 4 climb of the Côte de Campagnette,  into the stage, just north of Bimont. At , this was the highest point of a relatively fast and flat stage, which travelled through the undulating lowlands of Nord-Pas-de-Calais. The route passed through Saint-Omer, with an intermediate sprint at Cassel. The race then travelled through Steenvoorde, over the Category 4 climb of Mont Noir, and followed the road south-east from Bailleul and Armentières to Lille. The stage finished just east of the centre of Lille, at Villeneuve-d'Ascq.

Andy Schleck retired from the tour, before the departure from Le Touquet. A few kilometres into the stage, Chris Froome fell in an accident which also involved Bauke Mollema and Ion Izagirre. Froome was able to rejoin the peloton. By the time the race had reached the top of Mont Noir, Thomas Voeckler was in front of the peloton along with Luis Ángel Maté. Greg Henderson was forced to retire, following a crash towards the end of the race, whilst Voeckler was caught by the peloton with  remaining, with Maté also returning to the bunch around this time. The peloton was ready, once again, for a sprint finish. Marcel Kittel won his third stage out of four, but admitted that the stage had been fast and very nervous.

 Stage 5 
9 July 2014 — Ypres to Arenberg Porte du Hainaut, 

This flat stage departed from Ypres in Belgium. Eddy Merckx and King Philippe were both present to see the riders depart. Racing officially started between Ypres and Zonnebeke. The race then headed north-east towards Roeselare, before turning due south to Menen and then on to Wevelgem. The stage continued south, re-entering France just before arriving in Roubaix. From here, onwards, the stage featured nine sections of difficult cobble-set pavement, using some of the same roads as the Paris–Roubaix cycle race. The intermediate sprint took place a further  along the route south from Roubaix at Templeuve-en-Pévèle. The race then took a circuitous route west to Pont-à-Marcq, south to Bersée, and then east to Orchies. The culmination of the stage had the riders pass through several small villages in quick succession; Beuvry-la-Forêt, Tilloy-lez-Marchiennes, Warlaing, Wandignies-Hamage, Hornaing and Hélesmes. Finally, the stage finished just east of Wallers at the southern end of the Arenberg Trench, adjacent to the Arenberg Mine.

Inclement weather prompted tour organizers to remove two cobble segments from the stage route for safety reasons, leaving seven cobble segments for the riders to navigate.

Wet roads contributed to a multitude of crashes before the riders encountered the cobbles.  Reigning champion Chris Froome was involved in two crashes at the  point and the  point. These crashes, combined with a crash the previous day and the lingering effects of a serious crash in the Critérium du Dauphiné several weeks prior, forced his abandonment from the race.

Upon encountering the cobbles, the peloton splintered, with yellow jersey-wearer Vincenzo Nibali's team  leading the pack. Nibali's group opened up a lead of nearly two minutes prior to encountering the seventh and last cobble segment, upon which Astana's Lieuwe Westra accelerated, leaving behind all but Nibali, teammate Jakob Fuglsang, and 's Lars Boom.  Boom attacked the Astana riders on the last cobble segment and held his lead through the final kilometers to take his first victory of the 2014 season, as well as his first career stage win in the Tour de France. This came nine years to the day after the previous Dutch stage victory in the Tour.  Nibali finished 19 seconds behind Boom, in so doing putting two minutes into GC contenders Andrew Talansky, Tejay van Garderen, and Alejandro Valverde, and nearly two-and-a-half minutes into Tour favorite Alberto Contador.

 Stage 6 
10 July 2014 — Arras to Reims, 

This relatively fast and flat stage travelled from the department of Pas de Calais, through the departments of Somme, Aisne, and Marne. The stage started by heading south through Bapaume, Péronne, Ham, Tergnier and Chauny. The route then began to head east, over the Category 4 climb of Côte de Coucy-le-Château-Auffrique, with an intermediate sprint  later at Pinon. This was followed by the Category 4 climb of the Côte de Roucy, and the road east to Bourgogne. Finally, the race headed south into Reims.

Arnaud Gérard, Tom Leezer, Luis Maté and Jérôme Pineau took part in an early escape, ahead of the peloton. Crashes occurred during a day of sidewinds, along with a second day of rain, forcing the retirement of Xabier Zandio and Jesús Hernández, amongst others. The early escapees were each brought back to the peloton from  remaining, with Maté managing to stay in front for a further . Marcel Kittel had a mechanical problem in the final , and Michał Kwiatkowski attacked with  remaining. However, the sprint was won by André Greipel who, along with other sprinters, caught Kwiatkowski before the finish.

 Stage 7 
11 July 2014 — Épernay to Nancy, 

This long and undulating stage travelled through the departments of Marne, Meuse and Meurthe-et-Moselle. The stage departed from Épernay, with the race officially starting at Oiry. The route first headed east through Châlons-en-Champagne, Sainte-Menehould and Clermont-en-Argonne and continued on this course to Charny-sur-Meuse. The route then turned south-east just before travelling through Douaumont and then continued in this direction through Moulainville and Fresnes-en-Woëvre. An intermediate sprint took place at Hannonville-sous-les-Côtes and the south-easterly route continued through Bernécourt. The route turned east from Dommartin-lès-Toul and two Category 4 climbs came towards the end of the stage, these were the Côte de Maron and the Côte de Boufflers. The stage then finished in Nancy.

 Stage 8 
12 July 2014 — Tomblaine to Gérardmer La Mauselaine, 

The stage travelled through the departments of Meurthe-et-Moselle and Vosges. The stage had most of the route as undulating, with a mild climb. Towards the end, the stage entered low mountains.

This stage headed east out of the Tomblaine district of Nancy, and through Lunéville, before the route turned south towards Baccarat. The route continued south-west through Rambervillers to Épinal, followed by an intermediate sprint at Dinozé as the route turned east, once again, and followed the Moselle to Remiremont, Saint-Amé and Vagney.

Five riders were in the breakaway for the day. Sylvain Chavanel was the best climber in the breakaway. However, on the final climb Blel Kadri launched an attack which nobody was able to follow. Behind in the peloton  started chasing so that Alberto Contador could possibly win the stage. With 2 kilometres to go Blel Kadri had a 4-minute advantage over the peloton which would be enough for him to become the first French rider to win a stage of that Tour de France. As the peloton reached the final kilometre Contador made a number of attacks to try to gain time on Vincenzo Nibali and Richie Porte. He could only gain 3 seconds on Nibali and 7 on Porte. Critérium du Dauphiné winner Andrew Talansky of  crashed and finished 35th. He was over 4 and half minutes down in the overall standings in 16th place. Blel Kadri won the stage by over 2 minutes and also took charge of the King of the Mountains classification.

 Stage 9 
13 July 2014 — Gérardmer to Mulhouse, 

This low mountain stage travelled from the department of Vosges, into Haut-Rhin. The stage departed from Gérardmer with racing officially starting between Gérardmer and Xonrupt-Longemer. The route then began to climb the Category 3 Col du Wettstein at  before a long  descent east to the outskirts of Turckheim. An intermediate sprint took place at Linthal, before heading west for the biggest climb of the day. The route then took a fast  descent continuing south-east into Cernay and Wittelsheim, through Pfastatt and finally finishing in Mulhouse.

 Stage 10 
14 July 2014 — Mulhouse to La Planche des Belles Filles, 

This mountainous stage set off from the department of Haut-Rhin, headed back into Vosges and finished in the department of Haute-Saône. The stage started at Mulhouse, with racing officially starting just north of Wittenheim. The route turned north-west at Ensisheim and zig-zagged from Raedersheim, through Gundolsheim to Soultzmatt. The race then began the ascent of the Category 2  at  before descending to a sprint at Muhlele (Gunsbach). The race began to head west just before the sprint. This was rapidly followed by the race travelling through Munster. The route then turned to the south-west and traversed two Category 1 climbs. This was followed by a  descent to Kruth.

 Stage 11 
16 July 2014 — Besançon to Oyonnax, 

After the rest day in Besançon, this low mountain stage began in the department of Doubs, headed into Jura and finished in Ain. The stage departed from Besançon and had its racing officially starting just south-west of Avanne-Aveney. The route headed south-west to Arc-et-Senans and then turned south through Chamblay, Arbois, Montrond and Pont-du-Navoy to an intermediate sprint at Charcier. The southerly route then continued through Les Crozets and Chassal before entering the Jura Mountains. The stage finished with a  descent to Oyonnax.

References

External links 

2014 Tour de France
Tour de France stages